The 1983 season was the Cincinnati Bengals' 14th season in the National Football League, their 16th overall, and their fourth and final under head coach Forrest Gregg. 

Cincinnati lost six of their first seven games, then won six of nine to finish at 7–9. Despite the record, the Bengals claimed the top overall defense in the NFL, and were 4–2 in divisional games.

After the season in December, Gregg was allowed out of his contract's remaining year to succeed Bart Starr as head coach of the Green Bay Packers. Several days later, Indiana Hoosiers head coach Sam Wyche, a former Bengals quarterback, was named as his replacement.

Offseason

NFL Draft

Personnel

Staff

Roster

Regular season

Schedule 

Note: Intra-division opponents are in bold text.

Standings

Game summaries

Week 1: vs. Los Angeles Raiders

Awards and records 
 Passing: Ken Anderson (297 Att, 198 Comp, 2333 Yds, 66.7 Pct, 12 TD, 13 Int, 85.6 Rating)
 Rushing: Pete Johnson (210 Att, 763 Yds, 3.6 Avg, 16 Long, 14 TD)
 Receiving: Cris Collinsworth (66 Rec, 1130 Yds, 17.1 Avg, 63 Long, 5 TD)
 Scoring: Jim Breech, 87 points (16 FG; 39 PAT)

References

External links 
 1983 Cincinnati Bengals at Pro-Football-Reference.com

Cincinnati Bengals
Cincinnati Bengals seasons
Cinc